Ohlstedt is the terminus station on the Ohlstedt branch of Hamburg U-Bahn line U1. The rapid transit station was opened in 1918 and is located in the Hamburg suburb of Wohldorf-Ohlstedt, Germany. Wohldorf-Ohlstedt is part of the Hamburg borough of Wandsbek.

History 
At the time the station was opened, Ohlstedt was an enclave of the Free and Hanseatic City of Hamburg. Back in 1918, Wohldorf-Ohlstedt station was part of the Walddörferbahn. In February 1925 the station was electrified and integrated into the Hochbahn (U-Bahn) system, and named "Ohlstedt" in May 1925.

Layout 
The station's building and only entrance is located at Alte Dorfstraße, in the district's center. The single island platform and the two side tracks sit along a rail dam. Due to the lack of an elevator, the station is not handicap-accessible.

Service

Trains 
Ohlstedt is served by Hamburg U-Bahn line U1; departures are every 20 minutes, during rush hour every 10 minutes. The travel time to Hamburg Hauptbahnhof takes about 36 minutes.

Gallery

See also 

 List of Hamburg U-Bahn stations

References

External links 

 Line and route network plans by hvv.de 
 100 Jahre Hochbahn by hochbahn.de 

Hamburg U-Bahn stations in Hamburg
Buildings and structures in Wandsbek
U1 (Hamburg U-Bahn) stations
Railway stations in Germany opened in 1918